The Ciaphas Cain series is a collection of science fiction novels by Sandy Mitchell set in the Warhammer 40,000 universe.  They center on the eponymous character, an Imperial Commissar of the Imperial Guard, and his varied and colorful career.

Novels
Cain is the main character of Sandy Mitchell's novels published by the Black Library.  The Cain series currently stands at ten titles:

 Book 1: For the Emperor (2003)
 Book 2: Caves of Ice (2004)
 Book 3: The Traitor's Hand (2005)
 Book 4: Death or Glory (2006)
 Book 5: Duty Calls (2007)
 Book 6: Cain's Last Stand (2008)
Book 7: The Emperor's Finest (2010)
Book 8: The Last Ditch (2012)
Book 9: The Greater Good (2013)
Book 10: Choose Your Enemies (2018)

The novels are presented as Cain's personal and often rambling notes.  After his death, a third party edited them into a more coherent form, interspersed them with footnotes or snippets of other accounts where Cain's first-person (and self-centered) perspective does not provide sufficient context, and made them available for use by the Holy Inquisition.  This editor is revealed over the course of the first account to be Inquisitor Amberley Vail of the Ordo Xenos, Cain's long-time collaborator and herself a prominent figure in the accounts.

Cain also appears in ten short stories (featured respectively in the anthologies What Price Victory, Crucible of War,  and Bringers of Death), and one novella:

 Short Story 1: Fight or Flight (2002)
 Short Story 2: The Beguiling (2003)
 Short Story 3: Echoes of the Tomb (2004)
 Short Story 4: Sector Thirteen (2005)
 Short Story 5: Traitor's Gambit (2009)
 Short Story 6: A Mug of Recaff (2012)
 Novella: Old Soldiers Never Die (2012)
 Short Story 7: The Smallest Detail (2012)
 Short Story 8: The Little Things (2012)
 Short Story 9: Last Night at The Resplendent (2018)
 Short Story 10: The Bigger They Are (2021)
 Short Story 11: The Only Good Ork (2022)
 Short Story 12: Rotten to the Core (2022)
 Short Story 13: Three Questions (2022)

In April 2007 the first three books in the series and the 3 short stories were collected in a volume entitled Ciaphas Cain : Hero of the Imperium.

In October 2010 Defender of the Imperium, an omnibus compilation of Death or Glory, Duty Calls and Cain's Last Stand was released, and also contains the short stories Traitor’s Gambit and Sector Thirteen.

In September 2018 a new omnibus titled Saviour of the Imperium was released, including the novels The Emperor's Finest, The Last Ditch and The Greater Good, and it also contains the short stories A mug of Recaff, Old soldiers Never Die,  The Little Things  and The Smallest Detail.

There are also Audiobooks available for many of the Cain novels. The first For the Emperor, narrated by Stephen Perring and Penelope Rawlins, was released on the same date as the latest omnibus; in September 2018. There are 7 Audiobooks, which are the first seven novels, and 2 Audiodramas, which are unavailable as written stories:

 Audiodrama 1: Dead in the Water (2011)
 Audiodrama 2: The Devil You Know (2014)
 Audiobook 1: For the Emperor (2018)
 Audiobook 2: Caves of Ice (2019)
 Audiobook 3: The Traitor's Hand (2020)
 Audiobook 4: Death or Glory (2021)
 Audiobook 5: Duty Calls (2021)
 Audiobook 6: Cain's Last Stand (2021)
 Audiobook 7: The Emperors Finest (2022)
 Audiobook 8: The Last Ditch (2022)
 Audiobook 9: The Greater Good (2022)
Both of the Audiodramas are available on their own, but are also included in The Astra Militarum Audio Collection as parts 5 and 6.

Character

Ciaphas Cain is a "Commissar," a political officer of the Imperium of Man's troops. Commissars are charged with maintaining the morale and loyalty of Imperial troops, an important matter when one considers the horrific odds and staggering casualties of the "grim dark future" of the Warhammer 40K setting. Despite holding no standard rank and being outside the chain of command, commisars have wide discretionary powers, including summary execution or even decimation, in pursuit of their duties.  Cain, having observed the tendency of many members of the Commissariat to fall victim to "accidental" friendly fire, prefers to lead by example and encouragement instead of fear, and has gained a reputation for charismatic leadership, self-effacing heroism and concern for the common trooper.  This has spiraled rather out of Cain's control, as he is now regarded as a "Hero of the Imperium", and is frequently assigned to dangerous and unusual circumstances.  The truth, as presented in the novels, is that Cain is the sort of person he himself is supposed to execute: self-serving, incredibly paranoid, a truly skilled liar, and happy to put as many bodies between him and the enemy as possible in order to save his own skin.  The author has stated that the character of Cain was inspired by both Harry Flashman and Edmund Blackadder.

Cain is an unreliable narrator.  His memoirs (edited and presented as The Cain Archive by Inquisitor Amberley Vail) are completely self-centered, containing nothing on the context of his adventures, forcing Vail to intersperse his narrative with secondary sources.  Vail must also add occasional footnotes to some of his recollections to point out that Cain has just glossed over something another man might take pride in.  For instance, Vail at one point praises Cain's marksmanship, pointing out that he had just made quite a remarkable long-range shot with an inaccurate pistol, while Cain himself writes onward without acknowledging (or possibly even being aware of) his own skill.  Likewise, Cain views himself as a cowardly figure of little worth, often wondering why various enemy generals are so fixated on defeating him—leaving us completely ignorant (until Vail points it out) of the morale boost caused by the mere presence of a genuine "Hero of the Imperium", much less any acts of heroism that may be forthcoming.  In the end, Vail's limited interjections indicate that she believes Cain is too hard on himself; in the foreword to "Fight or Flight", author Sandy Mitchell admitted that he himself is not sure if Cain is truly a coward, or a genuine hero with a massive inferiority complex or a case of impostor syndrome.

Even though Cain has always sought to find some safe, quiet post (it could be argued that is in fact all he has ever wanted), he is one of the most combat-experienced commissars in the Imperium.  Some of his many notable exploits include being a liaison to Space Marine chapter which involved various first hand contact to Genestealers that killed various Terminators of The Reclaimers who were clearing a space hulk of Tyranids; visiting and surviving two different Necron tombs; fighting and bringing together the scattered PDF from a world and then driving off the Orks, and escaping on a Dark Eldar slave ship. He frequently refers to such experiences as invaluable as they taught him to fight (or more frequently, run away from) the enemies of the Imperium. Inquisitor Vail believes (albeit with a certain amount of irony) that it is precisely this quality that has made him such an effective leader and agent of the Imperium.  He is aided in these exploits by his martial skill, which is quite significant, as demonstrated by his ability to temporarily stalemate a Chaos Space Marine in melee with his chainsword. Vail's footnotes in the second novel indicated Cain was probably one of the finest swordsmen in his region of the galaxy.

Cain maintains his reputation of heroism primarily for its benefit to him; most soldiers around him obey his orders without question, and he is constantly invited to parties and upscale social functions.  It is, strangely, aided by his habits of self-preservation; in seeking out the last place the enemy is likely to be, he frequently wanders into the exact place they're pulling off the most secret or critical part of their schemes.  Of course, this habit has become so ingrained in his and the public's conscious that everyone expects him to volunteer for whatever particularly dangerous duty has just come along.  He is also humanitarian in his dealings with Imperial Guardsmen. Cain does not do this out of altruism, but rather because soldiers who like him are more likely to willingly fight for or protect him and/or less likely to shoot him from behind. Cain notes that he has tried to teach commissar cadets this alternative style of morale-boosting, with only marginal success.  Cain's cowardice and desire for self-preservation actually make him an unusually effective strategic commander compared to his contemporaries:  keeping your own men alive while killing as many of the enemy as possible using disproportionate sneak attacks is an efficient use of limited resources - in contrast with most other commissars, who are content to send their men on glorious but strategically pointless suicide charges.

Cain's past is shrouded in mystery. Vail's footnotes indicate that, despite her research into the subject, she could find no official documentation on where he was born or what his childhood was like. However, from his writings, it can be inferred that he was raised on a hive world and his parents both served in the Imperial Guard.  The situation is exacerbated by his habitual lying; so accomplished a dissembler is he that even nearby telepaths felt no urge to distrust him when he lied in their presence.  He has become so good at lying that he is sometimes unsure of where the lies stop and the actual Ciaphas Cain begins, and it is possible that no one ever truly knew him.  The closest to doing so would probably be Amberley Vail, not only due to her stewardship of his memoirs but through over a century of both professional and romantic entanglement.

According to Vail's footnotes, Cain retired from service (something very few people live long enough to do in WH40K) and took up service at a military academy on Perlia, where he trained potential Commissars, participated in the Thirteenth Black Crusade, and published an official biography: To Serve the Emperor: A Commissar's Life.  Passing away of natural causes, he was buried with full military honours—though, due to the many false allegations of his death, there is a standing order that Cain remain listed on active duty at all times, which has not been revoked even though he is documentably dead and interred.  The much longer and more self-critical "Cain Archive," from whence Inquisitor Vail publishes her accounts, were unorganized at the time of his death; for instance, Vail makes reference to having had to assemble at least one volume (Cain's Last Stand) by stitching together several vignettes scattered throughout the document.  Vail's introductions to each excerpt indicate that she is circulating them amongst fellow members of the Inquisition, with a strong caution not to make them available for public consumption so as to leave Cain's legacy untarnished.

The series has many similarities with the Flashman series of books by George MacDonald Fraser, in both style and content.  One major difference, in addition to the marked change in setting, is that Cain is a noticeably more sympathetic (or at least, less unsympathetic) character than Flashman.

Notable Associates

 Gunner Ferik Jurgen – Cain's personal aide. Noticeable for his powerful body odour and chronic psoriasis (which discourages others from getting too close to him), Jurgen is also a "blank", or a psychic null (which might account for other people's dislike of Jurgen as much as his hygiene problems, as can be surmised from how badly the more susceptible psykers respond to Jurgen even in friendly situations); this trait saved them both on more than one occasion. Jurgen has complete loyalty to Commissar Cain, and his unwavering dedication to him has helped both of them through many dangerous situations. Cain finds Jurgen an excellent aide, as Jurgen doggedly follows Cain's orders, always thinking of them as for the good of the Imperium, something which Cain finds extremely useful. Jurgen is also noted for his fear of flying and his exceptionally aggressive driving style; he routinely drives Cain's personal scout Salamander in a manner described as "insane" and, coupled with his literal-mindedness and loyalty, he will often crash through walls or drive straight up shuttle boarding ramps without hesitation. Jurgen also makes an excellent secretary, as very few people are able to get past him to see Cain unless it is very important (reducing the amount of office work done by Cain and allowing him to take "breaks" without his absence being noticed).  Despite his otherwise dogged adherence to authority, Jurgen's appearance has often been remarked as being extremely shabby for a soldier.  He has never been able to find a uniform that fit him properly, maintains a shabby beard (which he has medical dispensation for due to his skin diseases) and believes hygiene is something that happens to other people. Since Cain is largely based on the series of books called the Flashman Papers by George MacDonald Fraser and Blackadder, then it is reasonable to assume that Jurgen is based on Fraser's other creation McAuslan and Blackadder's erstwhile sidekick Baldrick, who are also earnest soldiers with poor hygiene.
 Inquisitor Amberley Vail – an inquisitor of the Ordo Xenos who worked with Cain on many occasions. She is described as an attractive blonde & blue eyed woman with an easy personality, in stark contrast to the stereotypical expectation of Inquisitors (which Vail noted was exactly the point). In the novels, it is strongly suggested that their relationship is a romantic one, and Cain appears to care for her a great deal. However, like all inquisitors, Amberley takes her job very seriously and would not hesitate to kill Cain if he posed a threat to the Imperium. Inquisitor Vail appears as an active character in For The Emperor, Duty Calls and Choose Your Enemies, makes brief cameos in Caves of Ice, Cain's Last Stand and The Last Ditch, and also contributes to the other books in the series, acting as editor of Cain's memoirs.  Despite temptation, Vail generally resists opportunities to annotate or justify her own portrayal in Cain's notes.
 Colonel Regina Kasteen and Major Ruput Broklaw - The regimental commander and second-in-command of the 597th Valhallan.  They are introduced in the first novel of the series as former company commanders in the 296th and 301st Valhallan, respectively, both of which fought in the defense of Corania against the tyranids and sustained such heavy casualties that bureaucrats in the Munitorium decided to simply merge the two units into one.  Cain is assigned the unenviable job of unifying the newly christened 296/301st, one half of which was once an all-male front-line Guard unit and the other an all-female reservist outfit.  Amongst other actions, Cain integrates the regiment at squad level, putting men and women side by side, and renames it the 597th (the sum of 296 and 301).  Despite earlier animosity, Kasteen and Broklaw develop a respectful and functional working relationship, not only with each other, but with Cain as well, who becomes deeply integrated into the command structure (serving almost as a third CO) and remains with the 597th for a good third of his career.
 Jenit Sulla – Sulla is a Lieutenant with the 597th Valhallan Regiment during the novels, and rose to become a general. Numerous extracts from her post-retirement memoirs are interspersed by Inquisitor Vail in the novels as background material, usually with a derogatory remark about Sulla's purple prose and complete lack of literary talent. Sulla sees Cain as a mentor, and remains oblivious to Cain's dislike for her due her aggressive and gung-ho attitude, which unnecessarily puts people (such as Cain) in danger.  However, even Cain cannot deny her efficiency and competence, and Vail's footnotes point out that Sulla's soldiers had complete confidence in her.
 Toren Divas - A Lieutenant and later the Major of the 12th Valhallan Artillery Regiment, Cain's unit prior to being reassigned to regimental HQ and the 597th. Divas is probably the closest thing Cain has to a best friend. He is an enthusiastic Imperial Guardsman and is always eager to fight the enemies of the Imperium head on, traits that Cain finds annoying and dangerous. Cain remarks several times in his memoirs that this enthusiasm is quite probably because Divas' posting in an artillery company means he fights those enemies from miles away where they can't shoot back, which was in fact Cain's reason for seeking out the post.
 Lord General Zyvan - 'I'm the Lord-bloody-General of the Rimward Sectors,...' His high opinion of Cain is reflected in that he often invites Cain to dine with him and arranges a supply of Cains' preferred hot beverage, the acquired-taste Tanna leaf tea, when Cain is present. Cain fights off heretics alongside Zyvan, saving the Lord Generals life, and enhancing his own reputation.

Amberley Vail's entourage
 Rakel - A nervous and excitable female psyker whom Cain describes as "almost completely round the bend" and having "a voice like fingernails on a blackboard." Upon meeting Jurgen, Rakel suffers an extreme physical and mental reaction to his presence, prompting Amberley to suspect Jurgen of being a psychic blank.
 Caractacus Mott - A savant with numerous bionic augmentations who frequently suffers logorrhea on any number of subjects, often at inopportune moments. Nevertheless, Cain seems to enjoy Mott's company, and Mott at times helps Cain cheat in gambling houses using an intuitive grasp of probability.

597th Valhallan Soldiers
 Sergeant Lustig and his squad Described by Cain as a capable squad leader, he and his squad make their first appearance in For The Emperor as honour guard for Kasteen and Cain, later helping them in bringing a group of Tau diplomats safely back to their HQ. They appear again in Caves of Ice being led by Cain in search for missing miners. Lustig is made an officer in The Traitor's Hand.
 Trooper Penlan is the only named member of Lustig's squad. She appears in all the books dealing with the Valhallan 597th and seems to be a magnet for accidents, gaining her the nickname "Jinxie". It is noted in Caves of Ice that other soldiers believe having her nearby would redirect their own bad luck to her. In The Traitor's Hand, some of her accidents are listed, with the observation that they often indirectly benefited the mission or the soldiers around her.
 Sergeant Grifen and her squad first appear in Caves of Ice. She and her squad accompany Cain on an expedition into the tunnels beneath the mining facility, where they encounter a series of hostile animals, Ork "Kommandos" and a force of Necrons. She and Mary Magot also appear in The Traitor's Hand assisting Cain again, this time against Chaos cultists. In The Traitor's Hand Cain suggests that Magot is perhaps not interested in men, and he also suggests in Caves of Ice that Magot and Grifen have a relationship deeper than squadmates. In Choose Your Enemies Grifen has been promoted to lieutenant.

The Reclaimers Chapter
 Sholer - An apothecary in The Reclaimers Chapter. Sholer is responsible for grafting augmetic fingers onto Cain's hand. In The Emperor's Finest, Sholer appears as a regular, if somewhat reclusive character studying tyranids on Fecundia.

See also
List of Warhammer 40,000 novels

References

Book series introduced in 2003
Warhammer 40,000 characters
Fictional soldiers
Warhammer 40,000 novels
Fiction with unreliable narrators
Bureaucracy in fiction
Black comedy books
Novels set in the future
Military science fiction
Science fantasy novels
Comic science fiction novels